was a feudal domain under the Tokugawa shogunate of Edo period Japan. It is located in Shinano Province, Honshū. The domain was centered at Iida Castle, located in what is now part of the town of Iida in Nagano Prefecture.

History
The area around Iida had been ruled during the Sengoku period by Akiyama Nobutomo, a retainer of Takeda Shingen. After the destruction of the Takeda clan, the lands came under the control of Tokugawa Ieyasu and were ruled by Suganuma Sadatoshi, followed by Mori Hideyori, and Kyōgoku Takatomo. Following the Battle of Sekigahara and the establishment of the Tokugawa shogunate, Ogasawara Hidemasa was relocated to Iida from Koga Domain in Shimōsa Province and made  daimyō with Iida Domain, a 50,000 koku holding in Shinano Province. After his transfer to Matsumoto Domain in 1613, the territory reverted to tenryō status ruled directly by the shogunate until 1617, when it was reassigned to Wakizaka Yasumoto, formerly of Ōzu Domain in Iyo Province. His son, Wakizaka Yasumoto followed, reducing the domain by 2,000 koku with a gift to one of his uncles. He was transferred to Tatsuno Domain in Harima Province in 1672, where his descendants resided to the Meiji restoration.

The Wakizawa were replaced by a junior branch of the Hori clan and the holdings of the domain were reduced to 20,000 koku. The domain's finances were never in good condition, and the situation continued to deteriorate over the years leading to widespread rioting in 1762 and in 1809. The 10th daimyō, Hori Chikashige was a close supporter of Mizuno Tadakuni and held important posts within the Shogunal government, including rōjū. the domain as increased to 27,000 koku, but was dropped to 17,000 koku on the failure of the Tenpō Reforms and subsequent backlash. During the Bakumatsu period, the domain lost another  2,000 koku for failing to stop passage of anti-government forces through its territory during  the Mito rebellion.

During the Boshin War, the domain supported the imperial side.  In July 1871, with the abolition of the han system, Iida Domain briefly became Iida Prefecture, and was later merged into the newly created Nagano Prefecture. Under the new Meiji government, Hori Chikahiro, the last daimyō of Iida Domain was given the kazoku peerage title of shishaku (viscount).

Bakumatsu period holdings
As with most domains in the han system, Iida Domain consisted of several discontinuous territories calculated to provide the assigned kokudaka, based on periodic cadastral surveys and projected agricultural yields.
Shinano Province
25 villages in Ina District

List of daimyō

See also
List of Han

References
The content of this article was largely derived from that of the corresponding article on Japanese Wikipedia.

External links
 Iida Domain on "Edo 300 HTML"

Notes

Domains of Japan
History of Nagano Prefecture
Shinano Province